Sigurd Grønli (24 August 1927 – 18 January 2001) was a Norwegian rower. He competed in the men's coxed four event at the 1948 Summer Olympics.

References

External links
 

1927 births
2001 deaths
Norwegian male rowers
Olympic rowers of Norway
Rowers at the 1948 Summer Olympics
People from Asker
Sportspeople from Viken (county)